Lucas Calderón (born 30 June 1998) is an Argentine professional footballer who plays as a forward for Sportivo Las Parejas.

Career
Calderón joined Gimnasia y Esgrima in October 2017, having previously been with Estudiantes. After being an unused substitute for a 2017–18 Argentine Primera División match with Newell's Old Boys on 14 May 2018, Calderón made his professional debut in the following campaign of 2018–19 against Godoy Cruz on 6 October at the Estadio Juan Carmelo Zerillo.

Personal life
Calderón is the son of former footballer José Luis Calderón.

Career statistics
.

References

External links

1998 births
Living people
Footballers from La Plata
Argentine footballers
Association football forwards
Argentine Primera División players
Primera B Metropolitana players
Club de Gimnasia y Esgrima La Plata footballers
Club Atlético Villa San Carlos footballers
Club Cipolletti footballers
Sportivo Las Parejas footballers